Bayazid Khan Karrani was the third Sultan of the Bengal Sultanate's Karrani dynasty.

Life
During the reign of his father, Sulaiman Khan Karrani, he was given the command of a force on a campaign to Orissa in 1567. The campaign was successful and the king, who was an Eastern Chalukya from Andhra who had conquered Orissa in the 1550s, was defeated. Bayazidpur, now Bajitpur, in modern-day Kishoreganj District was said to have been named after him.
 
After his father died on 11 October 1572, he ascended the throne. Assuming power, he broke allegiance and the outward suzerainty with the Mughal Empire which his father had established, and declared independence. He had his name read during the khutbah in the Friday prayer and issued coins with his own name. These actions turned the Afghan chiefs and nobles of his father, against Bayazid - making him an unpopular ruler. Bayazid attempted to banish the Afghan nobles, eventually leading to them conspiring against him.

Death
He only ruled for a few months before he was betrayed and assassinated by his cousin and sister's husband, Hansu. Hansu was later dethroned and killed by Sulaiman Khan's trusted nobles led by Wazir Ludi Khan. Bayazid's younger brother, Daud Khan Karrani, eventually took the power.

See also
 List of rulers of Bengal
 History of Bangladesh
 History of Bengal

References

1572 deaths
16th-century Afghan people
16th-century Indian monarchs
16th-century murdered monarchs
Indian people of Pashtun descent
16th-century Indian Muslims
Year of birth unknown
Karrani dynasty
Assassinated Afghan people
Assassinated Indian people
Assassinated royalty
Murder in 1572